Morrison Polkinghorne is an Australian textile designer specializing in handmade trimmings and tassels.  He and his partner, Robert Carmack, owned a bed and breakfast business in Battambang Cambodia before their business collapsed in the wake of the COVID-19 epidemic at which point they relocated to Australia.  Polkinghorne is known for his art which utilizes ink derived from lotus flowers.

References

Australian textile artists
Year of birth missing (living people)
Living people